Braeden Tkachuk (born September 16, 1999) is an American professional ice hockey left winger and captain of the Ottawa Senators of the National Hockey League (NHL). Tkachuk was chosen by the Senators as the fourth overall pick in the 2018 NHL Entry Draft. Prior to turning professional, Tkachuk played one season for the Boston University Terriers, earning All-Hockey East Rookie Team honors.

Internationally, Tkachuk has represented Team USA at the 2017 IIHF World U18 Championships and 2018 World Junior Ice Hockey Championships.

Playing career
After playing for the St. Louis AAA Blues U16 and committing to the USA Hockey National Team Development Program (USNDPT), Tkachuk agreed to play for Boston University after completing two seasons with the USNDPT. While playing for the university's Boston Terriers team, he had four goals and 14 points in 19 games as a freshman before making the U.S. under-20 national team for the 2018 World Junior Championships. Nearing the end of the season, Tkachuk was selected for the Hockey East Rookie Team after ranking fifth on the team in points.

Leading up to the 2018 NHL Entry Draft, Tkachuk was ranked second overall for North American skaters by the NHL Central Scouting Bureau. He was eventually drafted fourth overall by the Ottawa Senators. Tkachuk signed a three-year entry-level contract with the Senators on August 13, 2018, forgoing his collegiate career. After participating in the Senators preseason games, Tkachuk was sidelined for the Senators' first two regular season games with a groin injury. He eventually made his NHL debut on October 8 in a 6–3 loss to the Boston Bruins. The following game, on October 10, Tkachuk recorded his first career NHL goal, and first multi-goal game, in a loss to the Philadelphia Flyers. He became the fastest Tkachuk to record his first NHL goal, surpassing his brother and father. On October 17, after playing in four games for the Senators, it was announced that Tkachuk had a torn ligament in his leg and was set to be out for a month to recover. Tkachuk eventually returned to the Senators line-up on November 8, 2018, for a game against the Vegas Golden Knights. On March 28, 2019, in a game against the Florida Panthers, Tkachuk tied the Senators' franchise record for most shots on goal in a game with 12. In the same game, he scored his 20th goal of the season to tie Alexandre Daigle for the Senators' record for most goals by a teenage player in a season. Tkachuk finished the 2018–19 season with 22 goals, the second-highest among NHL rookies, behind Elias Pettersson's 28.

Tkachuk was named an alternate captain in the 2020–21 season. Tkachuk was selected on January 22, 2020, to replace the injured Auston Matthews on the Atlantic Division roster for the 2020 NHL All-Star Game. He finished the season with 17 goals and 36 points in 56 games and established himself as a pest to opposing teams and a leader on his own.

On October 14, 2021, Tkachuk signed a seven-year, $57.5 million contract with the Senators. On November 5, Tkachuk was named as the tenth captain in Senators franchise history. On November 27, 2021, Tkachuk was bit by Brendan Lemieux of the Los Angeles Kings during a scrum in the corner. Lemieux was assessed a match penalty and was suspended for five games. On December 11, 2021 Tkachuk scored his first NHL hat trick against Brian Elliott in a 4–0 win over the Tampa Bay Lightning. On April 5, 2022, Tkachuk scored a goal and three points in a 6–3 win over the Montreal Canadiens.

On December 2, 2022, in Tkachuk's 300th career game, the Senators captain recorded a Gordie Howe hat trick, scoring his 100th career goal and the game-winning goal in 3–2 overtime win over the New York Rangers.

International play

Tkachuk was the captain of the gold-winning U.S. under-18 national team at the 2017 IIHF World U18 Championships.

Tkachuk was selected to the U.S. under-20 national team for the 2018 World Junior Ice Hockey Championships in Buffalo, New York, winning bronze.

Personal life
Tkachuk was born in Scottsdale, Arizona as his father, Keith was a member of the Phoenix Coyotes at the time of his birth. He was raised in the St. Louis suburb of Chesterfield, Missouri, after his father's 2001 trade to the Blues. Both Tkachuk brothers attended Chaminade College Preparatory School.

Tkachuk is the younger brother of Florida Panthers forward Matthew Tkachuk. He is also cousins with former NHL player and current New Jersey Devils executive Tom Fitzgerald and his sons Ryan and Casey who are both NHL prospects. Kevin Hayes and his late brother Jimmy Hayes are also cousins of the Tkachuks and Fitzgeralds. 

Tkachuk is a dual citizen of both the United States and Canada, as his mother Chantal is a native of Winnipeg.

Career statistics

Regular season and playoffs

International

Awards and honors

References

External links

 

1999 births
Living people
American expatriate ice hockey players in Canada
American men's ice hockey left wingers
American sportspeople of Canadian descent
American people of Ukrainian descent
Boston University Terriers men's ice hockey players
Chaminade College Preparatory School (Missouri) alumni
Ice hockey people from Scottsdale, Arizona
Ice hockey people from St. Louis
National Hockey League first-round draft picks
Ottawa Senators draft picks
Ottawa Senators players
USA Hockey National Team Development Program players